Margaret Thatcher was Prime Minister of the United Kingdom from 4 May 1979 to 28 November 1990, during which time she led a Conservative majority government. She was the first woman to hold that office. During her premiership, Thatcher moved to liberalise the British economy through deregulation, privatisation, and the promotion of entrepreneurialism.

This article details the third Thatcher ministry she led at the invitation of Queen Elizabeth II from 1987 to 1990.

Election

The Conservatives were elected for a third successive term in June 1987, with a majority of 102 seats. It enabled Margaret Thatcher to become the longest-serving prime minister of the 20th century, as Britain's economic recovery continued.

Fate

Then, on 1 November 1990, came the first of a series of events which would spell the end of Margaret Thatcher's years in power. Sir Geoffrey Howe, the Deputy Prime Minister, long resentful of being ousted as Foreign Secretary, resigned from the cabinet over its European policy. Soon afterward, in his resignation speech in the House of Commons, he publicly denounced Thatcher, having once been one of her closest allies, personally and for her hostility towards the programmes of the European Community. On 14 November, former cabinet minister Michael Heseltine challenged Thatcher's leadership. Thatcher polled higher than him in the first round of the leadership contest, but failed to gain an outright victory in the first round of voting.

Within minutes of the result being announced, Thatcher informed reporters that she intended to let her name go forward for the second ballot. However, on 22 November, before a second round of the contest could take place, Margaret Thatcher announced her resignation as Prime Minister and Leader of the Conservative Party after more than 11 years, explaining that she was resigning to make way for a leader more likely to win the next general election.

Her successor was the Chancellor of the Exchequer, John Major, who was elected on 27 November 1990, and who at 47 became the youngest Conservative Prime Minister of the 20th century.

Cabinets

June 1987 to July 1989
:

Margaret Thatcher – Prime Minister
The Viscount Whitelaw – Deputy Prime Minister and Leader of the House of Lords and Lord President of the Council
The Lord Havers – Lord High Chancellor of Great Britain
John Wakeham – Leader of the House of Commons and Lord Keeper of the Privy Seal
Nigel Lawson – Chancellor of the Exchequer
John Major – Chief Secretary to the Treasury
Geoffrey Howe – Foreign Secretary
Douglas Hurd – Home Secretary
John MacGregor – Minister of Agriculture, Fisheries and Food
George Younger – Secretary of State for Defence
Kenneth Baker – Secretary of State for Education
Norman Fowler – Secretary of State for Employment
Cecil Parkinson – Secretary of State for Energy
Nicholas Ridley – Secretary of State for the Environment
John Moore – Secretary of State for Health
The Lord Young of Graffham – Secretary of State for Trade and Industry and President of the Board of Trade
Kenneth Clarke – Chancellor of the Duchy of Lancaster
Tom King – Secretary of State for Northern Ireland
Malcolm Rifkind – Secretary of State for Scotland
Paul Channon – Secretary of State for Transport
Peter Walker – Secretary of State for Wales
David Waddington – Chief Whip of the House of Commons and Parliamentary Secretary to the Treasury
Sir Patrick Mayhew – Attorney General for England and Wales

Changes
October 1987Lord Mackay of Clashfern succeeds Lord Havers as Lord High Chancellor of Great Britain.
January 1988Viscount Whitelaw retires and is succeeded by John Wakeham as Lord President of the Council. Lord Belstead succeeds Wakeham as Lord Keeper of the Privy Seal. Lord Belstead succeeds Viscount Whitelaw as Leader of the House of Lords.
July 1988Department of Health and Social Security broken up into component parts:
John Moore continues on as Secretary of State for Social Security.
Kenneth Clarke becomes Secretary of State for Health. Tony Newton succeeds Clarke as Chancellor of the Duchy of Lancaster.

July 1989 to November 1990
:

Margaret Thatcher – Prime Minister
Sir Geoffrey Howe – Deputy Prime Minister and Leader of the House of Commons and Lord President of the Council
The Lord Mackay of Clashfern – Lord High Chancellor of Great Britain
The Lord Belstead – Leader of the House of Lords and Lord Keeper of the Privy Seal
Nigel Lawson – Chancellor of the Exchequer
Norman Lamont – Chief Secretary to the Treasury
John Major – Foreign Secretary
Douglas Hurd – Home Secretary
John Gummer – Minister of Agriculture, Fisheries and Food
Tom King – Secretary of State for Defence
John MacGregor – Secretary of State for Education
Norman Fowler – Secretary of State for Employment
John Wakeham – Secretary of State for Energy
Chris Patten – Secretary of State for the Environment
Kenneth Clarke – Secretary of State for Health
Kenneth Baker – Chancellor of the Duchy of Lancaster
Peter Brooke – Secretary of State for Northern Ireland
Malcolm Rifkind – Secretary of State for Scotland
Tony Newton – Secretary of State for Social Security
Nicholas Ridley – Secretary of State for Trade and Industry and President of the Board of Trade
Cecil Parkinson – Secretary of State for Transport
Peter Walker – Secretary of State for Wales

Changes
October 1989
John Major succeeds Nigel Lawson as Chancellor of the Exchequer.
Douglas Hurd succeeds John Major as Foreign Secretary.
David Waddington succeeds Douglas Hurd as Home Secretary.
Tim Renton succeeds David Waddington as Chief Whip.
January 1990Norman Fowler resigns as Secretary of State for Employment and is succeeded by Michael Howard.
May 1990Peter Walker resigns as Secretary of State for Wales, having announced his intention in March. David Hunt succeeds him.
July 1990Nicholas Ridley resigns as Secretary of State for Trade and Industry. Peter Lilley succeeds him.
November 1990At the start of the month, Geoffrey Howe resigns and the title of Deputy Prime Minister is not reallocated. John MacGregor succeeds him as Lord President of the Council and is in turn succeeded by Kenneth Clarke as Secretary of State for Education and Science, who is succeeded by William Waldegrave as Secretary of State for Health.

List of ministers
Members of the Cabinet are in bold face.

Notes

References

Sources

Government
1980s in the United Kingdom
1987 establishments in the United Kingdom
1990 disestablishments in the United Kingdom
1990s in the United Kingdom
Ministry 3
Ministries of Elizabeth II
British ministries
Cabinets established in 1987
Cabinets disestablished in 1990

pl:Pierwszy rząd Margaret Thatcher
pl:Drugi rząd Margaret Thatcher